Ranmasu Uyana is a park in Sri Lanka containing the ancient Magul Uyana (Royal Gardens). It is situated close to Isurumuni Vihara and Tissa Wewa in the ancient sacred city of Anuradhapura, Sri Lanka. According to an inscription found in Vessagiriya, the water to the park was supplied by Tessa Wewa and then released to rice fields around Isurumuni Vihara.

In the park are various ponds, and the remains of small buildings. According to legend it is believed that Prince Saliya met Asokamala in this garden.

Ranmasu means Goldfish. The Royal Goldfish Park has the Star Gate map which is encircled by fish.

History
Royal gardens were first constructed here in the time of King Tissa (3rd century BC), when the reservoir was built. However, the pleasure pavilions and other fixtures seen today date from the 8th-9th centuries AD.

Popular culture

Claims published on the internet and television documentaries that a carving within the park known as Sakwala Chakraya it was an interface or stargate "between humans and some intelligent species from outer space" have been called "absurd" by archeologists who suggest the carving could simply be an early world map.

Gallery

See also
History of Sri Lanka
Ancient Constructions of Sri Lanka

References

External links

Royal Water Gardens of Anuradhapura

Parks in Sri Lanka
Anuradhapura
Tourist attractions in North Central Province, Sri Lanka
Geography of North Central Province, Sri Lanka
Archaeological protected monuments in Anuradhapura District
Anuradhapura period